Tipple can mean:

 Tipple, a structure used for loading coal, ore or minerals into railroad cars
 Tipple (insect), a common name for insects in the family Tipulidae, or Crane Flies
 Tiple, musical instruments related to the guitar and ukulele.   
 Slang term for alcoholic beverage
 Bertrand M. Tipple (1868–1952), American Methodist writer and lecturer, founder and president of Methodist International College in Rome, Italy
 Chloe Tipple (born 1991), New Zealand sports shooter
 Dan Tipple (1890–1960), American Major League Baseball pitcher in 1915